The Double Florin is a 1924 thriller novel by John Rhode, the pen name of the British writer Cecil Street. Like H.C. McNeile's Bulldog Drummond and Agatha Christie's The Secret Adversary the plot revolves around a Bolshevik conspiracy to destroy capitalism and western democracy. The title refers to the Double florin coin.

It was his second published novel and anticipated the introduction of his best-known character Dr. Priestley in his following book The Paddington Mystery. The conspiracy is being directed by Professor Sanderson, a brilliant mathematician. Sanderson is not himself a communist, but is manipulating the organisation to try and create a new order based on pure reason.

Synopsis
A young English aristocrat Lord Robert Mountmichael is recruited by LIDO, a secret organisation formed by international financiers to battle the forces of disorder. He eventually exposes the Professor as the mastermind behind the plot to destroy Britain's social system as a prelude to world collapse, while falling in love with his daughter Joan. After exposing Sanderson's true motivation, the professor is shot dead by one of his fanatical henchman.

References

Bibliography
 Evans, Curtis. Masters of the "Humdrum" Mystery: Cecil John Charles Street, Freeman Wills Crofts, Alfred Walter Stewart and the British Detective Novel, 1920-1961. McFarland, 2014.
 Herbert, Rosemary. Whodunit?: A Who's Who in Crime & Mystery Writing. Oxford University Press, 2003.
 Turnbull, Malcolm J. Victims Or Villains: Jewish Images in Classic English Detective Fiction. Popular Press, 1998.

1924 British novels
Novels by Cecil Street
British mystery novels
British thriller novels
Geoffrey Bles books
Novels set in London